Linlithgowshire was a Scottish county constituency of the House of Commons of the Parliament of the United Kingdom from 1708 to 1950. It elected one Member of Parliament (MP) by the first past the post voting system. It was replaced in 1950 by an equivalent constituency named West Lothian.

Creation
The British parliamentary constituency was created in 1708 following the Acts of Union, 1707 and replaced the former Parliament of Scotland shire constituency of Linlithgowshire.

History
The constituency elected one Member of Parliament (MP) by the first past the post system until 1950.

For the 1950 general election, the constituency was abolished and replaced by  West Lothian.

Members of Parliament

Election results

Elections in the 1830s

Hope resigned, causing a by-election.

Elections in the 1840s

Hope was appointed a commissioner of Greenwich Hospital, London, requiring a by-election.

Hope resigned after being appointed Lieutenant Governor of the Isle of Man, causing a by-election.

Elections in the 1850s

Dundas resigned upon his appointment as Lieutenant Governor of Prince Edward Island, causing a by-election.

Elections in the 1860s

Elections in the 1870s

Elections in the 1880s

Elections in the 1890s

Elections in the 1900s

Elections in the 1910s 

General Election 1914–15:

Another General Election was required to take place before the end of 1915. The political parties had been making preparations for an election to take place and by the July 1914, the following candidates had been selected; 
Liberal: John Pratt
Unionist: James Kidd
Labour: (George Dallas ?)

Elections in the 1920s

Elections in the 1930s

Election in the 1940s

References 

Historic parliamentary constituencies in Scotland (Westminster)
Politics of West Lothian
Constituencies of the Parliament of the United Kingdom disestablished in 1945
Constituencies of the Parliament of the United Kingdom established in 1708
Linlithgow